Khun Hna Sin A Lwan is a 1990 Burmese black-and-white drama film, directed by Maung Wunna starring Thu Maung and Khin Than Nu. Maung Wunna won the Best Director Award, Thu Maung won the Best Actor Award and Khin Than Nu won the Best Actress Award in 1990 Myanmar Motion Picture Academy Awards for this film.

Cast
Thu Maung as Myat Htun
Khin Than Nu as Khin Mi
Zaw Lin as Wai Lin
Su Hlaing Hnin as Khine Mar Mar

Awards

References

1990 films
1990s Burmese-language films
Burmese drama films
Films shot in Myanmar
1990 drama films